Phytoene desaturase (lycopene-forming) (CrtI, four-step phytoene desaturase)  (15-cis-phytoene:acceptor oxidoreductase (lycopene-forming)) are enzymes found in archaea, bacteria and fungi that are involved in carotenoid biosynthesis. They catalyze the conversion of colorless 15-cis-phytoene into a bright red lycopene in a biochemical pathway called the poly-trans pathway. The same process in plants and cyanobacteria utilizes four separate enzymes in a poly-cis pathway.

Biochemistry

Bacterial phytoene desaturases were shown to require FAD as a cofactor for their function. During the chemical reaction in total four additional double bonds are introduced into phytoene:

 15-cis-phytoene + 4 acceptor  all-trans-lycopene + 4 reduced acceptor (overall reaction)
 (1a) 15-cis-phytoene + acceptor  all-trans-phytofluene + reduced acceptor
 (1b) all-trans-phytofluene + acceptor  all-trans-zeta-carotene + reduced acceptor
 (1c) all-trans-zeta-carotene + acceptor  all-trans-neurosporene + reduced acceptor:
 (1d) all-trans-neurosporene + acceptor  all-trans-lycopene + reduced acceptor

Applications
In 2000 it was discovered that the gene insertion of a bacterial phytoene desaturase into transgenic tomatoes increased the lycopene content without the need to alter several of the plants enzymes. This approach was later used in rice to increase its β-carotene content resulting in the Golden Rice project.

See also 
 15-Cis-phytoene desaturase
 Phytoene desaturase (neurosporene-forming)
 Phytoene desaturase (zeta-carotene-forming)
 Phytoene desaturase (3,4-didehydrolycopene-forming)

References

External links 
 

EC 1.3.99